Donvier is a brand of popular Japanese-made ice cream makers, originally produced by Nippon Light Metal and distributed in the US by Virginia Beach, Virginia-based Nikkal Industries from 1984 to 1990, and currently manufactured and sold by Browne & Co. under their Cuisipro brand. The device consists of a cylindrical metal tub (with refrigerant sealed inside) that is frozen overnight. An accompanying hand crank is then used to turn a paddle that makes ice cream from a mixture within the tub.

References

External links
Donvier Ice Cream Maker, Button Museum

Home appliance brands
Ice cream